is a former Japanese football player.

Playing career
Tsukamoto was born in Nagasaki Prefecture on November 22, 1969. After graduating from Aichi Gakuin University, he joined Japan Football League (JFL) club Yanmar Diesel (later Cerezo Osaka) in 1992. He played many matches as side back. The club won the champions in 1994 and was promoted to J1 League from 1995. However he could hardly play in the match from 1995. In 1997, he moved to JFL club Sagan Tosu and played many matches until 1998. In 1999, he moved to Regional Leagues club Sagawa Express Osaka. He retired end of 2000 season.

Club statistics

References

External links

1969 births
Living people
Aichi Gakuin University alumni
Association football people from Nagasaki Prefecture
Japanese footballers
J1 League players
Japan Football League (1992–1998) players
Cerezo Osaka players
Sagan Tosu players
Association football defenders